Hộ Pháp ("Defender of the Doctrine", commonly translated as "Pope") Phạm Công Tắc (1890–1959) was an important leader in the establishment and development of the Cao Đài religion, founded in 1926. He was the leader of the Tây Ninh branch, the dominant branch of Cao Đài in southern Vietnam.

Religious life
In 1925, Phạm Công Tắc and two colleagues (Cao Quynh Cu and Cao Hoai Sang) tried to contact spiritual entities. Using table-tapping, they supposedly got messages: from their deceased relatives first, then from Saints, and then from God. They all were admitted to be God's first disciples in the Third Religious Amnesty.

Caodaiists believe that on 25 April 1926, eighteen mediums, including Phạm Công Tắc, were chosen by God to spread his teachings and carry out his instructions. Phạm Công Tắc wrote the Cao Đài Religious Constitution and scriptures currently worshipped by Caodaiists. He was promoted to Hộ Pháp, one of the top-ranking posts of the clergy.

In 1927, Phạm Công Tắc was transferred to Cambodia by the colonial government; he took the opportunity to establish Cao Đài Foreign Missions.

After acting Giáo Tông Lê Văn Trung's death, he became the religious head and established a number of other religious organs.

He gave the order to begin the construction of the Tây Ninh Holy See and later officiated the inauguration. Other buildings and houses were set up under his supervision, including the Temple of Intuition, the Temple of Enlightenment, Long Hoa Market, the Temple of Acknowledgement, and the Temple of the Goddess. Others were planned for more favorable conditions such as the Temple of Thousands of Dharma, the Main Entrance Avenue, and Cao Đài University which have not been started as of 2007.

Phạm Công Tắc was also a missionary; he gave speeches on the Holy Never Pathway and Esoteric Practice which were shorthanded by stenographers and published in 1970.

A religious figure in Vietnam from 1940s to 1950s
In 1941, many Vietnamese rebellions against French colonists broke out throughout the country. French rulers did what they could to suppress the movement, imprisoning those who challenged their power. Notably, they felt threatened by the quick development of Cao Đài. Hộ Pháp Phạm Công Tắc and at least four other Cao Đài dignitaries were sent into exile in Madagascar. During this period, French soldiers seized the Tây Ninh Holy See and the other religious offices, temporarily prohibiting all religious activities.

As a result, the Cao Đài Armed Forces were founded by General Tran Quang Vinh in Southern Vietnam so as to protect Cao Đài believers as well as to overthrow the French government with Japanese military aid. However, Japanese Armed Forces were defeated in 1945 and withdrew. The Vietnamese people in general, and the Cao Đài Army in particular, were faced with the Allied, then French, return to Vietnam. 
    
In 1946, the political situation changed. Faced with the threat of the communist-led Việt Minh in the south, the French decided to bring back Hộ Pháp Phạm Công Tắc from exile and to ask for his cooperation in the struggle against the communists. Phạm Công Tắc agreed, but not all Cao Đài leaders followed his lead.  A treaty was signed between General Tran Quang Vinh and the French colonists on 9 June 1946. From then on, Hộ Pháp Phạm Công Tắc resumed his post as leader of the Tây Ninh branch of the Cao Đài. Phạm Cong Tác collaborated with the French with the aim of securing the independence of at least the southern part of Vietnam.

In 1954, Vietnamese Head of State Bảo Đại asked Hộ Pháp Phạm Công Tắc to be one of the advisors for the Vietnamese delegates in Geneva, Switzerland. He went to Paris and tried to prevent Vietnam from being partitioned. His persuasion failed. After that, he paid visits to Taiwanese and South Korean leaders. In 1955, General Nguyen Thanh Phuong, unofficially instigated by Ngô Đình Nhu, surrounded Tây Ninh Holy See, demanding an internal purification; this was actually a raid on those who opposed Ngô Đình Diệm's regime. Hộ Pháp Phạm Công Tắc fled the country, seeking political asylum in Cambodia. He lived there until his death in 1959.

Books
Phạm Công Tắc was the author of many books on Cao Đài, including:

How to practice Caodaism under the pen-name Ai Dan (1928)
A Visit to Heaven (1927)
The Third Method of Practicing Caodaism (1947)
Breviaries for secular activities

A symbol of esoterism for Caodaists
It is believed that Hộ Pháp Phạm Công Tắc was taught how to practice esoterism by God. He established the first meditation house, the Temple of Intuition, and entered for the first esoteric performance. However, there has been no evidence that he taught someone else to do so. He was the only Cao Đài leader who preached esoteric and exoteric practices of Cao Đài.

References
Life and work of His Holiness Pham Cong Tac
Biography of His Holiness PCT by His Holiness Thuong Sanh
The Divine Path to Eternal Life
Chân dung Hộ Pháp Phạm Công Tắc – Trần văn Rạng – 1974
Lời thuyết Đạo của Hộ Pháp Phạm Công Tắc –– Tài liệu Tòa Thánh Tây Ninh – 1973
Bí Pháp – Tài liệu Tòa Thánh Tây Ninh- 1973
Con Đường Thiêng Liêng Hằng Sống – Tài liệu Tòa Thánh Tây Ninh - 1973 
Đại Đạo Sử Cương – Trần văn Rạng – 1972 
Đại Thừa Chơn Giáo – Chiếu Minh – 1956
Bí Pháp Luyện Đạo – Bát Nương Diêu trì Cung – Bản Thảo.
Tự Điển Cao Đài – Nguyễn văn Hồng

References

Pham Cong Tac
Pham Cong Tac
1890 births
1969 deaths